The Goioerê River is a river of Paraná state in southern Brazil, a tributary of the Piquiri River. The name means "field of water" in the local Kaingang language.

See also
List of rivers of Paraná

References
Brazilian Ministry of Transport

Rivers of Paraná (state)